Norbert Gombos was the defending champion, but decided not to defend his title. 
Jordan Thompson won the title, defeating Adam Pavlásek in the final 4–6, 6–4, 6–1.

Seeds

Draw

Finals

Top half

Bottom half

References
 Main Draw
 Qualifying Draw

Challenger La Manche - Singles